Gustavo Biosca Pagés (29 February 1928 – 1 November 2014) was a Spanish football player and manager.

Career
Born in L'Hospitalet de Llobregat, Barcelona, Catalonia, Biosca played as a defender for España Industrial, Barcelona and Condal.

He made his international debut for Spain in 1951, earning a total of 11 caps, including 2 in FIFA World Cup qualifying matches.

As a coach, he managed Pontevedra, Sant Andreu, Real Valladolid, Sabadell, the Spanish under-21 national team and Terrassa.

Later life and death
Biosca died on 1 November 2014, at the age of 86.

References

1928 births
2014 deaths
Spanish footballers
Association football defenders
La Liga players
Segunda División players
FC Barcelona players
CD Condal players
Spain B international footballers
Spain international footballers
Spanish football managers
Pontevedra CF managers
UE Sant Andreu managers
Real Valladolid managers
CE Sabadell FC managers
Spain national under-21 football team managers
Terrassa FC managers
Footballers from L'Hospitalet de Llobregat